Archbishop Packiam Arokiaswamy (born 1921 in Kombeikadu) was an Indian prelate and bishop for the Roman Catholic Diocese of Tanjore. He was ordained as a priest in 1946. On 16 January 1971, he was nominated as Bishop of Ooty and was consecrated as bishop on 28 March 1971. However within a few months, on 6 December 1971, he was promoted to Archbishop of Bangalore. He was appointed bishop of Tanjore on 12 September 1986. Though he was appointed as Bishop of Tanjore, the Vatican allowed him to retain the title of Archbishop (Personal title). He was thus referred to as Archbishop Packiam Arokiasamy, Bishop of Tanjore. He retired 28 June 1997. He died in 2003.

References 

1921 births
2003 deaths
People from Tamil Nadu
Indian Roman Catholic bishops
Roman Catholic archbishops of Bangalore